The Asia Fistball Association (AFA) is the Asian continental federation of the International Fistball Association and serves to unite the national fistball associations of Asia. The AFA was founded as part of a video conference of the participating associations and the IFA.

Organization

President 
Cheng Tsz-man from Hong Kong was elected the first president of the AFA in 2021 and represents it internally and externally.

Presidium AFA 
The Presidium of the Asia Fistball Association is elected for a period of two years. The current executive committee includes five people. In addition, there are a total of three assistants.

Assistant President: Wong Kwun-fung

Associations 
Currently, the Asian Fistball Association has 13 member associations.

World Cup participants 
In 1999, the Japanese men's national fistball team took part in a fistball world championship for the first time. To date, four different nations have participated in World Championships.

Men

Women

Male U18

Female U18

References 

Organizations established in 2021